Jayleen Pea Tufele (born July 25, 1999) is an American football nose tackle for the Cincinnati Bengals of the National Football League (NFL). He played college football at USC.

Early years
Tufele attended Bingham High School in South Jordan, Utah. As a sophomore in 2014, Tufele started on the varsity team, making 63 tackles and six sacks, which earned him a spot on the MaxPreps Sophomore All-American first-team. As a junior, Tufele anchored a defense that tallied eight shutouts, making 57 tackles and 10.5 sacks on his way to being named the Salt Lake Tribune’s high school football MVP. Tufele did not play his senior year due to a torn ligament in his foot.

Tufele also played rugby in high school.

Recruiting
Tufele was a consensus top-40 recruit and received scholarship offers from over 20 schools, including Michigan, Notre Dame, Ohio State, Utah, and USC.
Tufele announced his commitment to USC on National Signing Day and enrolled in June.

College career
Tufele redshirted the 2017 season. As a redshirt freshman in 2018, Tufele appeared in 12 games, starting five times. He made 23 tackles, 4.5 tackles for loss, and three sacks. In a week eight game against Utah, Tufele returned a fumble 48 yards for a touchdown, making him a nominee for the 2018 Piesman Trophy, which is awarded for the most impressive play made by a lineman. After the season, he was named to the All-Pac-12 second team, won USC’s Defensive Lineman of the Year award, and was a Pac-12 Freshman Defensive Player of the Year honorable mention.

As a redshirt sophomore in 2019, Tufele started all 13 games and made 41 tackles, 6.5 tackles for loss, and 4.5 sacks, which was the second-most on the team. After the season, Tufele was named to the All-Pac-12 first team, an honorable mention on Phil Steele’s All-American team, and repeated as the Defensive Lineman of the Year for USC.

Statistics

Professional career

Jacksonville Jaguars
Tufele was drafted by the Jacksonville Jaguars in the fourth round, 106th overall, of the 2021 NFL Draft. On May 21, 2021, he signed his four-year rookie contract with Jacksonville. He was placed on injured reserve on October 29, 2021. He was activated on December 4.

On August 30, 2022, Tufele was waived by the Jaguars.

Cincinnati Bengals
On August 31, 2022, Tufele was claimed off waivers by the Cincinnati Bengals.

Personal life
Tufele is of Polynesian descent. His father Line also played football. Tufele has two sisters and two younger brothers.

References

External links
USC Trojans bio

1999 births
Living people
Players of American football from Salt Lake City
American football defensive linemen
USC Trojans football players
Jacksonville Jaguars players
Cincinnati Bengals players